White Waltham is a village and civil parish,  west of Maidenhead, in the Royal Borough of Windsor and Maidenhead in Berkshire, England. White Waltham Airfield is in the parish.

Extent
In the south, the parish includes the hamlets of Paley Street and Littlefield Green. White Waltham village is clustered and sits in the mid-west of the parish. To the northeast is Woodlands Park, on the edge of Maidenhead, and the Maidenhead Business Park. In the northeast corner of the parish is Woolley Green and in the northwest, most of Littlewick Green.

History
The area was made up of a few manor houses, many of which evolved into country houses, for example Waltham Place, with its organic farm and gardens which are open to the public. The Church of England parish church of St Mary dates from Normans times, but has many fourteenth century and Victorian features.  Frequent disputes as to the boundary between White Waltham and Bray occurred at intervals since 1286 and Thomas Hearne, historian, gives an account of the beating of the boundaries in his own life-time, mentioning all the place-names and commenting on 'the insolence of the parishioners of Bray in transgressing their bounds.'

Sir Constantine Henry Phipps, Lord Chancellor of Ireland, was buried at St. Mary in 1723. Thomas Hearne was born at Littlefield Green in 1678. Acquiring the patronage of the local lord of the manor, Francis Cherry, he rose to become assistant-keeper of the Bodleian Library in Oxford and the author of many important works.  White Waltham School was established in 1828 and has been developed and expanded since, providing primary education for pupils between the ages of 5 and 11 and has legal academy status. The area had approximately half of the population in the late Victorian period but was overall significantly poorer in terms of real property. 

Today White Waltham has more than five times as many homes with 1,214. The area's agriculture was noted as of high fertility justifying its protection after World War II. After World War II the south of White Waltham was proposed as land for Berkshire's new town to rehouse Londoners made homeless by The Blitz. However, central and local government agreed in 1949 to use the alternative of Bracknell, as the White Waltham site would have encroached on good quality agricultural land, and was not on a railway.

White Waltham Cricket Club
The village cricket club (White Waltham Cricket Club) was founded in 1879. Not without its ups and downs it has survived until today with just short breaks for two World Wars. The ground is generally accepted as one of the more attractive and in more recent years one of the best wickets in the County. The original pavilion was situated at the closest point to the pub, The Beehive, with an extra wide wicket gate, only removed in recent years, for players struggling to find their way back after the post match revelries. It was a small, green painted, timber building originally about twelve feet by eight feet consisting of a single dressing room and a tool shed, extended to provide a further dressing room in the 1920s.

In 1939 the ground was requisitioned by the RAF. for training purposes but always treated considerately by them. Later they used it for recreation and a few village cricketers still available were invited to join their team. A sad reminder of both Wars and the toll on village life, and relatives of Club members exists today with the War Memorial at the top of the ground. White Waltham airfield was a supply field during the Second War distributing replacement aircraft of all types, bombers and fighters, to where they were needed. Metal mesh reinforcing has only in recent years been removed from some of the airfield and runway lights were also found during recent excavations. 

In the mid 1960s the ground underwent a major levelling operation with a wedge of ground being excavated from the top side of the ground and deposited on the bottom lower side. The original ground level still exists today, being the top of the bank by the road. This along with the land drains laid at the time of levelling may be why the bottom side of the ground drains better than the top.

For this period the club played on the RAF. sports ground, now the meadow behind todays pavilion, and even today remnants of the ground still exist - the concrete base of the R.A.F. pavilion can be seen just over the ditch in the bottom corner behind the seat, a gate post from the old footbridge (still there in the early 1980s) still leans precariously near this point, and the concrete slab bases for the nets are under the grass behind the oak tree by the car park, used in the 1980s during the Village Fete for 'bowl the cricket club batsman' stall they used the clubs then movable mat for the net and facing bowling other than very slow on the slabs which were then very uneven was quite and adventure, remember just gloves pads and box, no helmets or arm guards or thigh pads. Somewhere in the meadow the base of the square is still thought to exist. 

In 1968 after the levelling was completed and the erection of the new pavilion, the timber faced pavilion forming the front half of today's pavilion, it became one of the best grounds in the area. The opening of the new pavilion was celebrated with an invitation match the Club versus the then President, R.H.Oppenheimers Xl which included several famous cricketers including Alec Bedser and Denis Compton who reportedly scored a typically classy half century when the Presidents Xl lost 3 early wickets cheaply. 

The Club continued to develop through the seventies and eighties. In 1974 the Lord's Taverners visited and photos from that day are still on display in the club, most notably that of the former England wicket keeper Godfrey Evans walking down the pavilion steps on his way out to bat. In the early 1980 the Club doubled the size of the pavilion, extending the showers, extending the club room. The new kitchen, had an internal window installed so the ladies doing teas could watch the cricket. indeed the original 1968 Pavilion was designed, at their insistence, so the ladies could watch the cricket from the then Kitchen location and that window still exists at the end of the wooden part of todays pavilion. 

Three benefit games were played against Middlesex CCC, the first of these in 1988 When Mike Gatting, then captain of both the County and England, celebrated his benefit year. The Middlesex team entered fully into the spirit of the day in spite of poor ground & weather conditions, typified by Gatting himself when, advised that the landlord of the Beehive had bet £50 to charity he would not go to the pub, over he went. The popular England captain also spent time with children from the village primary school brought especially across to see him. The following year saw Roland Butchers benefit when the Club beat their county opponents. And in 1990 the Club hosted a match supporting the Paul Downton benefit year. Although unable to run a match the Club did support the Middlesex beneficiary the following year, Simon Hughes, with a dinner which doubled as the end of season dinner (held in the pavilion in those days), giving an excellent speech and presenting the Young Player of the Year trophy. 

The Club has not fared as well in cup cricket only reaching one more final of the Julian Cup, having won in 1924 its inaugural year, losing to Cookham Dean in the 1984 final. The Club have however hosted several Julian Cup semi finals, and one final in 1988 between Marlow and Tudor Taverners. Perhaps the Clubs most notable cup run was in the 1976 Haig National Village Knock-out tournament losing by one run to Whiteley Village in the Regional Final (a win would have put the Club in the last 8 in the country).

Carters Steam Fair
In 1964, the famous "Great Steam Fair" was held for three days at Shottesbrooke Park near White Waltham.  This is widely considered to be the forerunner of today's steam and vintage rallies in England, such as the Great Dorset Steam Fair.

Nearest places

References

Sources

External links

 White Waltham Parish Council
 White Waltham Village Association
 

 
Villages in Berkshire
Civil parishes in Berkshire
Royal Borough of Windsor and Maidenhead